James Fortescue (15 May 1725 – May 1782) was an Irish politician.

He sat in the Irish House of Commons for Dundalk between 1757 and 1760 and County Louth between 1761 and his death. He was also elected for Monaghan in 1776, but chose to continue sitting for Louth.

He was appointed to the Irish Privy Council on 7 May 1770.

He was the son of Thomas Fortescue, brother of William Henry Fortescue, 1st Earl of Clermont, and father of Thomas James Fortescue and William Charles Fortescue, 2nd Viscount Clermont.

References

1725 births
1782 deaths
Members of the Privy Council of Ireland
Irish MPs 1727–1760
Irish MPs 1761–1768
Irish MPs 1769–1776
Irish MPs 1776–1783
James
Members of the Parliament of Ireland (pre-1801) for County Louth constituencies
Members of the Parliament of Ireland (pre-1801) for County Monaghan constituencies